Shane Devine (February 1, 1926 – February 22, 1999) was a United States district judge of the United States District Court for the District of New Hampshire.

Education and career

Born in Manchester, New Hampshire, Devine was in the United States Army during World War II, from 1944 to 1945. He attended the United States Military Academy from 1945 to 1946. He received a Bachelor of Arts degree from the University of New Hampshire in 1949 and a Juris Doctor from Boston College Law School in 1952. He was in private practice in Manchester from 1952 to 1978.

Federal judicial service

On May 17, 1978, Devine was nominated by President Jimmy Carter to a seat on the United States District Court for the District of New Hampshire vacated by Judge Hugh H. Bownes. Devine was confirmed by the United States Senate on June 23, 1978, and received his commission on June 27, 1978. He served as Chief Judge from 1979 to 1992. He assumed senior status on September 8, 1992 and served in that capacity until his death on February 22, 1999.

References

Sources
 

1926 births
1999 deaths
University of New Hampshire alumni
Boston College Law School alumni
Judges of the United States District Court for the District of New Hampshire
United States district court judges appointed by Jimmy Carter
20th-century American judges
20th-century American lawyers
United States Army personnel of World War II
United States Military Academy alumni